Watsonidia navatteae is a moth in the family Erebidae. It was described by Hervé de Toulgoët in 1986 and is found in Bolivia.

References

Phaegopterina
Moths described in 1986